Olympique de Marseille was once again forced to fight for its top-flight survival following a dire season, in which the club almost went bankrupt, despite the expensive sale of Robert Pires to Arsenal. Former Spain national team coach Javier Clemente was sacked following the poor run of results, and his replacement Tomislav Ivić just saved Marseille from relegation.

Squad

Goalkeepers
  Cédric Carrasso
  Stéphane Trévisan
  Damien Grégorini

Defenders
  Patrick Blondeau
  Jérôme Pérez
  Jacques Abardonado
  Pierre Issa
  Zoumana Camara
  Manuel dos Santos
  Lilian Martin
  Abdoulaye Méïté
  Bruno Ngotty
  William Gallas
  Jean-Christophe Marquet

Midfielders
  Jérôme Leroy
  Sébastien Pérez
  Frédéric Brando
  Djamel Belmadi
  Brahim Hemdani
  Lucas Bernardi
  Jovan Stanković
  Mickaël Marsiglia
  Karim Dahou
  Klas Ingesson
  Daniel Montenegro
  Adriano
  Pablo Calandria

Attackers
  Ibrahima Bakayoko
  George Weah
  Florian Maurice
  Marcelinho Paraíba
  Fernandão
  Dramane Coulibaly
  Cyrille Pouget
  Cédric Mouret

Competitions

Division 1

League table

Results summary

Results by round

Matches

Topscorers
  Djamel Belmadi 8
  George Weah 5
  Jérôme Leroy 4
  Ibrahima Bakayoko 3
  Adriano 3

Sources
RSSSF - France 2000/01

Olympique de Marseille seasons
Marseille